Samuel Raymond Scottron (February 1841 – October 14, 1908) was a prominent African-American inventor from Brooklyn, N.Y. who began his career as a barber. He was born in Philadelphia in 1841. He received his engineering degree from Cooper Union in 1878.

He was a community leader in New York, setting up organizations to promote racial harmony and fairness, as well as a public speaker and writer on race relations. He was a member of the Brooklyn board of education, and a leader in the Republican Party. He fought for the end of slavery in Cuba and Puerto Rico. Scottron served as Chairman of the Cuban Anti-Slavery Committee which met at the Cooper Institute.

He invented a special mirror bracket that allowed one to see oneself as others saw them. He went on to receive four more patents, one of which being the curtain rod.

Career
Samuel Scottron moved with his family to New York City when he was a child, where he completed grammar school. During the American Civil War, he was the sutler for the 3rd United States Colored Infantry and almost went bankrupt. To recoup his fortunes, he first operated grocery stores in Gainesville and Jacksonville, Florida, and then a barber shop in Springfield, Massachusetts. It was there that he developed and patented his first invention, the adjustable window cornice. Moving to Brooklyn, New York, he worked as a traveling salesman for an import-export business located in lower Manhattan while continuing to patent his inventions and, by the late 1880s, was able to support himself and his family by manufacturing the products derived from his patents. His company, the Scottron Manufacturing Company, was located at 98 Monroe Street in Brooklyn. He helped improve society through his anti-slavery efforts and his inventions.

Family
Samuel Scottron married Anna Maria Willett, a native New Yorker, in 1863; they would have five children.

Samuel Raymond Scottron died of natural causes on October 14, 1908.

Inventions
 Improved Mirror, March 31, 1868
 Adjustable Window Cornice, February 17, 1880
 Cornice, January 16, 1883
 Pole Tip, September 21, 1886
 Curtain Rod, August 30, 1892
 Supporting Bracket, September 12, 1893

Sources 
Ohio History Connection: African Americans in Ohio
United States Patent and Trademark Office
Brooklyn Public Library: The Brooklyn Daily Eagle

References

External links
 

1841 births
1905 deaths
Activists for African-American civil rights
19th-century American inventors
People from Brooklyn
Cooper Union alumni
African-American inventors
African-American activists
New York (state) Republicans